Konstantin Vyrupayev (10 October 1930 – 31 October 2012) was a Soviet wrestler and Olympic Champion.

He competed at the 1956 Summer Olympics in Melbourne where he won a gold medal in Greco-Roman wrestling, the bantamweight class. At the 1960 Summer Olympics in Rome he won a bronze medal in the featherweight class.

References

1930 births
2012 deaths
Soviet male sport wrestlers
Olympic wrestlers of the Soviet Union
Wrestlers at the 1956 Summer Olympics
Wrestlers at the 1960 Summer Olympics
Russian male sport wrestlers
Olympic gold medalists for the Soviet Union
Olympic bronze medalists for the Soviet Union
Olympic medalists in wrestling
Medalists at the 1960 Summer Olympics
Medalists at the 1956 Summer Olympics